The Spanish American Mine is a historical uranium mine located approximately  northeast of Elliot Lake, Ontario, owned and operated by Rio Algom Ltd. The site is  southeast of the Denison Mine.

The mine was in operation from 1958 to 1959, when it was closed due to water inflow from a fractured zone. During this time it produced 79,000 tons of ore.

Other mines in the area
 Stanleigh Mine
 Can-Met Mine
 Milliken Mine
 Panel Mine
 Denison Mine
 Stanrock Mine
 Quirke Mine(s)
 Pronto Mine
 Buckles Mine
 Lacnor Mine
 Nordic Mine

See also

Quartz-pebble conglomerate deposits
Uranium mining
List of uranium mines
List of mines in Ontario

References

External links 
 Mindat.org - Spanish American Mine, Blind River-Elliot Lake uranium district, Algoma District, Ontario, Canada
 Denison Environmental - Denison mine and tailings management area
 History of uranium mining in Canada

Uranium mines in Ontario
Mines in Elliot Lake
Underground mines in Canada
Former mines in Ontario
Rio Algom